Rockport School is an independent day and boarding school for boys and girls from 2.5 years to 18 years in the British Public School tradition.

History
The school was founded in 1906  by Geoffrey Bing of Rossall School and Keble College, Oxford, with the original aim to "prepare boys for the Public Schools and the Royal Naval College, Dartmouth". Bing was 29 and had taught previously in St George's, Broadstairs and at St Andrew's School, Southborough, Tunbridge Wells. Rockport began with only four boys, an assistant master and a matron but quickly grew in size. The school now has around 200 pupils and accepts both boys and girls from the age of 3 until 18 (A Level) as day or boarding pupils. The school celebrated its centenary year in 2006 by building a new arts centre.

The headmaster is a member of the 16 Group of the Independent Association of Preparatory Schools and the school is represented by the Independent Schools Council (ISC). In January 2014 the school became the first school in Ireland, north or south, to be granted regional membership of the international conference of Round Square Schools. Global membership of Round Square was conferred upon the school in March 2016. In September 2016 Rockport established the first school-based Golf Academy in Ireland.

Notable alumni

Arts and media
 Dudi Appleton, journalist and film director
 Lady Caroline Blackwood, journalist and novelist
 Turlough Convery, actor
 Shaun Davey, composer
 Daniel Edelstyn, filmmaker, screenwriter and actor
 Howard Ferguson (composer)
 Gary Lightbody, musician Snow Patrol
 Flora Montgomery, actress
 Jonny Quinn, musician (Snow Patrol)
 James Quinn (film administrator), one of the longest-serving Directors of the British Film Institute
 Jessica Reynolds, actress
 Willoughby Weaving, poet of the Great War

Politics
 Geoffrey Bing, Labour MP for Hornchurch and first Attorney General of Ghana
 Gordon Campbell, Baron Campbell of Croy, Conservative politician and Secretary of State for Scotland from 1970 to 1974
 Nigel Casey, Diplomat, British High Commissioner to South Africa  
 Natalie Evans, Baroness Evans of Bowes Park, Leader of the House of Lords
 Robin Glendinning, playwright and former politician instrumental in founding the Alliance Party of Northern Ireland
 Sir John Gorman, soldier, Unionist politician
 Charles Johnston, Baron Johnston of Rockport, Conservative politician, businessman
 Alan McFarland, Unionist politician 
 Rafton Pounder, Unionist politician
 John Robb, surgeon; Irish Senator and founder of the New Ireland Group
 John Turnley, Irish nationalist activist

Business
 John Crosslé, founder of the Crosslé Car Company
 Sir Peter Gadsden, 652nd Lord Mayor of London

Military
 Sir Michael McCorkell, soldier, public servant and Lord Lieutenant of County Londonderry for 25 years
 Sir John Morrison Forbes, Vice-Admiral. Royal Navy officer who became Naval Secretary.

Sports
 Ronnie Adams, car racer
 Fred Covington, cricketer
 Ben Reynolds, athlete
 Paddy Wallace, rugby player
 John Watson, Formula 1 racing driver and commentator

References

External links
Rockport School website
Good Schools Guide Review

Round Square schools
Private schools in Northern Ireland
Primary schools in County Down
Boarding schools in Northern Ireland
Boarding schools in Ireland
Educational institutions established in 1906
Grade B1 listed buildings
Preparatory schools in Northern Ireland
1906 establishments in Ireland